The Lạch Tray Stadium is a multi-use stadium in Hai Phong, Vietnam.  It is currently used mostly for football matches and is the home stadium of Hải Phòng F.C. of the V.League 1.  The stadium holds approximately 30,000 spectators.

History

Lach Tray Stadium was built in 1957 from a horse farm (a yard with land of Lach Tray Horse Club). One year later, on the evening of January 1, 1958, the first international football match took place at Lach Tray Stadium, a match between Hai Phong and the Chinese team. 2-0). That same year, the Hai Phong team competed in the second round with teams from the Democratic People's Republic of Korea (2-2), Phnom Penh (Cambodia).

In 1959, the stands were replaced by cement and covered roofs in the stands.

In 1963, there took place a one-table match in the Football League of the Socialist Republic of Poland, Czechoslovakia, North Korea and Vietnam 2 (in fact, the football team in Haiphong instead. the Mongolian team).

In 1972, when the United States sent bombers bombing the North in general and Hai Phong in particular, the rooms of two stands A and B were used by the Hai Phong hospital as a rescue.

In 1977, the yard was rebuilt with the reconstruction of the stands, with four  lights for football matches in the evening. Lach Tray Stadium was renamed to Central Stadium.

After this renovation, Lach Tray yard was repaired several times in 1995 (completed in 2001, repaired A and B stands, C and D stands, fixed yard and track; cost: 34,950 billion VND) and 2003 (for SEA Games 2003), electronic board, fund: 14,830 billion VND).

In addition to football and track and field, many other sports competitions as well as major cultural events are held on the stadium.

In addition to the Hai Phong football club, other teams of Hai Phong (dissolved, merged or renamed) also used to make their home such as Hai Phong Electricity, Cam River Chemicals, Hai Phong Port, Hai Phong Cement, Hai Phong Construction and Military Region 3.

Stadium structure

Stand A
This is the stadium's most modern spectator stand with an all-seating capacity of 7,600. It has two stories and is covered by a concrete roof. Stand A turns north-east, going in the direction of Lach Tray.

Stand B
Stand B turns in the direction of South-West. The stand is fully equipped with permanent seats and can accommodate 4,800 people. This is the gathering spot for the most enthusiastic fans of the local Hải Phòng FC. The stand has a small roof partially covering the middle part of the stand.

Stand C & D
These are the two most distant podiums, with no seats, no roof, and a capacity of nearly 2500 each.

External links
Stadium information

Football venues in Vietnam
Buildings and structures in Haiphong
Haiphong FC